Richard Bannister Hughes Mills (1810-1875), known as Richard Bannister Hughes and also Ricardo Hughes, was a British expatriate businessman in Uruguay. Notable as a rancher and entrepreneur, Hughes helped to modernize Uruguayan agriculture.

Originally from Liverpool, Hughes arrived in Montevideo on Christmas Day 1829 and eventually went into business with his two younger brothers. In 1856 he founded one of the first tourist estancias, Estancia La Paz. He was one of the founders of Villa Independencia (now Fray Bentos) and a salted meat factory which later became Liebig's Extract of Meat Company Limited.

See also
 British immigration to Uruguay

References

1810 births
1875 deaths
Uruguayan people of British descent
British expatriates in Uruguay
Uruguayan businesspeople
19th-century British businesspeople